The 1986–87 Phoenix Suns season was the 18th season for the Phoenix Suns of the National Basketball Association. The Suns started their fourteenth season under head coach John MacLeod. At  in late February, management decided to replace the longstanding MacLeod with Dick Van Arsdale, a former Suns player from the 1975–76 Finals  team (coached by MacLeod).

All Suns' home games were played at Arizona Veterans Memorial Coliseum.

Walter Davis again led the Suns in scoring, averaging 23.6 points for the season. The Suns had another 20-point scorer in Larry Nance, who garnered a career-high 22.5 points and a team-high 8.7 rebounds a game. Third-year point guard Jay Humphries averaged 7.7 assists per game to go with 11.3 points per game. For the 32-year-old Davis, it was an All-Star season for him, his 6th in 10 seasons with the Suns, and would be the last time of his career he was honored as an All-Star.

Offseason

NBA Draft

Roster
{| class="toccolours" style="font-size: 85%; width: 100%;"
|-
! colspan="2" style="background-color: #423189;  color: #FF8800; text-align: center;" | Phoenix Suns roster
|- style="background-color: #FF8800; color: #423189;   text-align: center;"
! Players !! Coaches
|-
| valign="top" |

Transactions

Free agents

Additions

Subtractions

References

External links
 Standings on Basketball Reference

Phoenix Suns seasons